Metin is a Turkish given name and a surname. Notable people with the name include:

Surname
Tümer Metin (born 1974), Turkish international footballer

Given name
Metin Akan (born 1983), Turkish professional footballer
Metin Akpınar (born 1941), Turkish actor
Metin Aktaş (born 1977), Turkish footballer
Metin Aslan (born 1978), Austrian footballer
Metin Ataseven (born 1972), Swedish politician
Metin Lütfi Baydar (born 1960), Turkish medical scientist
Metin Boşnak (born 1965), Turkish scholar of American Studies and Comparative Literature, and poet
Cemal Metin Bulutoğluları (born 1960), Turkish Cypriot mayor of the capital of Northern Cyprus
Metin Çelik (born 1970), Turkish-Dutch politician
Metin Depe (born 1981), Turkey football defender
Metin Diyadin (born 1968), Turkish football manager and retired player
Metin Erksan (1929–2012), Turkish film director and art historian
Metin Ersoy (1934–2017), Turkish singer
Metin Hüseyin, British television and film director
Metin Kaçan (1961–2013), Turkish author and novelist
Metin Kaplan (born 1952), the leader of the radical Islamist movement Kalifatsstaat based in Cologne, Germany
Metin Kurt (1948–2012), Turkish footballer
Metin Oktay (1936–1991), Turkish footballer
Metin Serezli (1934–2013), Turkish actor
Metin Sitti, Turkish roboticist and university professor
Metin Tekin (born 1964), Turkish professional football player
Metin Toker (1924–2002), Turkish journalist and writer
Metin Türel (born 1935), Turkish football coach
Metin Yenal, German actor active in the United Kingdom
Metin Yüksel (1958–1979), Kurdish Islamist from Turkey
Metin Yurdanur (born 1952), Turkish sculptor
Metin Bostancıoğlu (born 1942), Turkish politician
Metin Günay (born 1963), Turkish director

Given names
Turkish-language surnames
Turkish masculine given names